Fences is an American indie rock band from Seattle, Washington formed by lead vocalist and guitarist Christopher Mansfield, guitarist Benjamin Greenspan, bassist and vocalist Lindsey Starr and drummer Elliott Garm Chaffee. They released their debut studio album Fences in 2010 and Lesser Oceans in 2015.

History 
Christopher Mansfield was born in Brockton, Massachusetts, the youngest in a family of ten children. He attended Berklee College of Music.

In 2009, his debut EP, Ultimate Puke, was discovered via Myspace by Sara Quin of popular Canadian indie band Tegan & Sara.  Quin ended up producing, recording and adding vocals to his self-titled debut album, Fences, released on September 28, 2010. Fences went on to make the SPIN magazine's year-end list of "Albums You May Have Missed" in 2010.

Mansfield had also caught the attention of Seattle rapper Macklemore, who came across his performance from Songs for eating and drinking, a collective of Seattle musicians who dine together and share music written specifically for that event.

In late 2010 and early 2011, Fences toured in support of punk rock band Against Me! and in July 2011, the band toured with indie pop band Hellogoodbye. In August 2011, Mansfield collaborated with Macklemore & Ryan Lewis on "Otherside" (Remix), and he also co-wrote "Ten Thousand Hours" from Macklemore’s 2012 album The Heist, along with the vocals of Fences bassist Lindsey Starr.

In 2013, Fences was signed to Elektra Records. "When I heard Chris Mansfield's demos for this album, I knew I had to work with him," said Elektra president Jeff Castelaz. "The songs he and Fences cohort Benjamin Greenspan created for Lesser Oceans capture those moments that pass most of us by in our hectic lives."

On July 29, 2014, Mansfield released a new single titled "Arrows" in collaboration with Macklemore & Ryan Lewis, along with the announcement of Lesser Oceans. The single reached number one on Billboard Magazine's Emerging Artists chart. Lesser Oceans was released on March 10, 2015, and features production by Death Cab for Cutie's Chris Walla, Jacquire King (Of Monsters and Men) and Ryan Lewis.

Personal life 

Christopher Mansfield has openly mentioned his sobriety on his blog and Twitter account. In an interview with a Seattle publication, he discusses the time he spent in rehab, saying "I also came to terms with the fact I cannot drink like other people. I know I put a lot about it in the music of Fences and have an image of being that kind of person. The 'drunk tortured artist.' It is total bullshit! In reality, I was blowing any chances I may have of ever touring or recording a real record or meeting any goals short or long."

Band members 

Christopher Mansfield – vocals, guitar
Benjamin Greenspan – guitar, keyboard
Lindsey Starr – bass, vocals
Elliott Garm Chaffee – drums

Discography

Studio albums

Fences 
Release date: September 28, 2010
Track listing

Lesser Oceans 
Release date: March 10, 2015
Track listing

FAILURE SCULPTURES 
Release date: June 21, 2019
Track listing

Extended plays 
 Ultimate Puke (April 1, 2008)
 To the Tall Trembling Trees (Jan 1, 2016)

Singles

References

External links 

 

Musical groups from Seattle
Indie rock musical groups from Washington (state)
Elektra Records artists